Muhammet Akpınar (born 6 February 2002) is a Turkish professional footballer who plays as a forward for Serik Belediyespor.

Professional career
On 4 July 2019, Akpınar signed his first professional contract with Trabzonspor. Akpınar made his professional debut for Trabznnspor in a 3–1 UEFA Europa League loss to FC Krasnodar on 7 November 2019.

Honours
Trabzonspor
Turkish Cup: 2019–20

References

External links
 
 
 

2002 births
Sportspeople from Trabzon
Living people
Turkish footballers
Turkey youth international footballers
Association football forwards
Trabzonspor footballers
TFF Second League players